Thomas Refsum (18 February 1878 – 18 December 1957) was a Norwegian sport shooter. He was born in Sørum, and his club was Christiania Skytterlag. He competed in military rifle and free rifle at the 1912 Summer Olympics in Stockholm.

References

External links

1878 births
1957 deaths
People from Sørum
Shooters at the 1912 Summer Olympics
Olympic shooters of Norway
Norwegian male sport shooters
Sportspeople from Viken (county)
20th-century Norwegian people